This is a list of former high school athletic conferences in the Northwest Region of Ohio, as designated by the OHSAA. If a conference had members that span multiple regions, the conference is placed in the article of the region most of its former members hail from. Because the names of localities and their corresponding high schools do not always match and because there is often a possibility of ambiguity with respect to either the name of a locality or the name of a high school, the following table gives both in every case, with the locality name first, in plain type, and the high school name second in boldface type. The school's team nickname is given last.

Auglaize County League
 Wapakoneta Blume Redskins (192?-29, to Mid-Western League)
 Buckland Indians (192?-64, consolidated into Wapakoneta)
 Cridersville Rams (192?-64, consolidated into Wapakoneta)
 St. Marys Memorial Roughriders (192?-29, to MWL)
 New Bremen Cardinals (192?-70, to Wayne)
 New Knoxville Rangers (192?-70, to Wayne)
 Wapakoneta St. Joseph Saints (192?-70, to Wayne)1
 Waynesfield-Goshen Tigers (192?-70, to West Central Ohio Conference)2

 Concurrent with Wayne 1956-70.
 Concurrent with Logan County League 1960-70.

Big Five League
 Bowling Green Bobcats (1929–31, to Buckeye League 1934)
 Lima Central Spartans (1929–31, to Southern Ohio League 1941)
 Defiance Bulldogs (1929–31, to Northwest Ohio)
 Fostoria Redmen (1929–31, to Buckeye League 1934)
 Lima South Tigers (1929–31,to Southern Ohio League 1941)

Black Fork Valley Conference
The all-time members of the Black Fork Valley Conference.
(1979–1982)
Charter Members
 Ashland Crestview Cougars (1979-1982)
 Lucas Cubs (1979–1982)
 Mansfield Christian Flames (1980-1982, Basketball Only)
 Plymouth Big Red (1979–1982)

Buckeye League/Conference
The league was created when Columbian, Fremont Ross, and Sandusky left the Little Big 7 league to join with Bowling Green, Findlay, and Fostoria. When Bowling Green and Fostoria left for the Great Northern League (and Tiffin went to the NOL), the league added two schools from the Lake Erie League and rebranded as the Buckeye Conference. The league ended in 1987 as most schools joined either the Buckeye Central Conference or the Erie Shore League.

 Bowling Green Bobcats (1934–54, to Great Northern)
 Tiffin Columbian Tornadoes (1934–54, to Northern Ohio)
 Findlay Trojans (1934–87, to Buckeye Central)
 Fostoria Redmen (1934-35.1939–54, to Great Northern)
 Fremont Ross Little Giants (1934–87, to Buckeye Central)
 Sandusky Blue Streaks (1934–39, 1954–87, to Erie Shore)
 Tiffin Junior Order Home Juniors (1938–43, closed)
 Marion Harding Presidents (1947–87, to Ohio Heartland)
 Elyria Pioneers (1954–87, to Erie Shore)
 Lorain Steelmen (1954–87, to Erie Shore)
 Lorain Admiral King Admirals (1962–87, to Erie Shore)
 Mansfield Senior Tygers (1962–81, to Ohio Heartland in 1987)

Crawford County League
A small-school county league, the CCL was organized in 1935 and did not have a change in membership until 1958. Nevada joined in 1961, after the Wyandot County League folded, with the CCL only having four remaining schools. Buckeye Central and Colonel Crawford, two recent consolidations, left for the North Central Conference the following year, with the three remaining schools consolidating into Wynford in 1963.

 Chatfield Tigers (1935–60, consolidated into Buckeye Central)
 Brokensword Holmes-Liberty Pirates (1935–63, consolidated into Wynford)
 Leesville Trojans (1935–58, consolidated into North Robinson)
 Lykens Panthers (1935–61, consolidated into Holmes-Liberty)
 Monnett Mount Zion Bulldogs (1935–63, consolidated into Wynford)
 New Washington Indians (1935–60, consolidated into Buckeye Central)
 North Robinson Robins (1935–60, consolidated into Colonel Crawford)
 Sulphur Springs Yellow Jackets (1935–60, consolidated into Colonel Crawford)
 Tiro Tigers (1935–60, consolidated into Buckeye Central)
 New Winchester Whetstone Hornets (1935–58, consolidated into North Robinson)
 New Washington Buckeye Central Bucks (1960–62, left for North Central Conference)
 North Robinson Colonel Crawford Eagles (1960–62, left for Johnny Appleseed Conference (joined in 1961) and North Central Conference)
 Nevada Knights (1961–63, consolidated into Wynford)

Firelands League
 Clyde Fliers (1934–39)
 Huron Tigers (1934–53, to Lakleland Conference)
 Castalia Margaretta Polar Bears (1934–53, to Lakleland Conference)
 Milan Indians (1934–53, to Huron-Erie League)
 Monroeville Eagles (1934–53, to Huron-Erie League)1
 Norwalk St. Paul Flyers (1936–53)
 Berlin Heights Tigers (1941–53, to Huron-Erie League)
 New London Wildcats (1947–53, to Lakleland Conference)1
 Vermilion Sailors (1947–53, to Lakleland Conference)

 Concurrent with Huron County League throughout FL tenure.

Great Lakes League
(1956–2003)
The GLL existed from fall of 1956 until spring of 2003 before essentially transforming into the Greater Buckeye Conference.  It had been born off of the old Great Northern Conference's Orange Division.  The following schools were members at some point:

 Bowling Green Bobcats (1956–60, 1969–78, to Northern Lakes)
 Oregon Clay Eagles (1956-2003, to Toledo City League)
 Fostoria Redmen (1956-2000, to Northern Ohio)
 Sylvania Northview Wildcats (1956–96, to Northern Lakes, known as Sylvania until 1978)
 Temperance (MI) Bedford Mules (1960-2000, to Southeastern (MI))
 Port Clinton Redskins (1963–80, to Sandusky Bay)
 Toledo Rogers Rams (1965–67, to Toledo City)
 Toledo Whitmer Panthers (1965–69, 1984-2003, to Toledo City)
 Napoleon Wildcats (1978–97, 2002–03, to Greater Buckeye)
 Lima Shawnee Indians (1980–82, to Western Buckeye)
 Fremont Ross Little Giants (1991-2003, to Greater Buckeye)
 Findlay Trojans (1995-2003, to Greater Buckeye)
 Sandusky Blue Streaks (1997-2003, to Greater Buckeye)
 Lorain Admiral King Admirals (2000–02, to Lake Erie)
 Lorain Southview Saints (2000–02, to Lake Erie)

Great Northern Conference
(c. 1945-1956)

The Great Northern Conference was created shortly after the end of World War II with the inaugural members of Clay, Maumee, Perrysburg, Rossford, Whitmer, and Sylvania.  Anthony Wayne would join in 1953 after recently being consolidated.  The GNC eventually added several members in 1956, splitting into a big schools division (Orange Division) and small schools division (Blue Division), both which would later split off into the Great Lakes League and Northern Lakes League, respectively.

 Oregon Clay Eagles (1945–1956)
 Maumee Panthers (1945–1956)
 Perrysburg Yellow Jackets (1945–1956)
 Rossford Bulldogs (1945–1956)
 Sylvania Wildcats (1945–1956)
 Toledo Whitmer Panthers (1945–1956)
 Whitehouse Anthony Wayne Generals (1953–1956)

Greater Buckeye Conference
(2003-2011)

 Findlay Trojans (joined the Three Rivers Athletic Conference in 2011)
 Fremont Ross Little Giants (joined the Three Rivers Athletic Conference in 2011)
 Lima Senior Spartans (joined the Three Rivers Athletic Conference in 2011)
 Marion Harding Presidents
 Napoleon Wildcats (joined the Northern Lakes League in 2011)
 Sandusky Blue Streaks (joined the Northern Ohio League in 2011)

Hardin County League
(19??–1964)
 Alger Eagles (19??-64, consolidated into Upper Scioto Valley)
 Dunkirk Dragons (19??-52, consolidated into Hardin Northern)
 Forest Rangers (19??-62, consolidated into Riverdale)
 Dola Hardin Northern Polar Bears (19??-64, Dola until 1952, to Blanchard Valley 1965)
 McGuffey Rockets (19??-64, consolidated into Upper Scioto Valley)
 Mt. Victory-Dudley Green Devils (19??-62, consolidated into Ridgemont)
 Ridgeway Tigers (19??-62, consolidated into Ridgemont)
 Roundhead Indians (19??-64, consolidated into Upper Scioto Valley)
 Mt. Blanchard Purple Hurricanes (1960-62, consolidated into Riverdale)
 Wharton Dragons (1960-62, consolidated into Riverdale)

Huron County League
 Greenwich Shamrocks (pre-1925-53, to Huron-Erie League)1
 Monroeville Eagles (pre-1925-53, to Huron-Erie League)2
 New Haven Yellow Jackets (pre-1925-53, to Huron-Erie League)1
 New London Wildcats (pre-1925-53, to Lakeland Conference)3
 North Fairfield Indians (pre-1925-53, to Huron-Erie League)1
 Townsend Tigers (pre-1925-52, consolidated into Townsend-Wakeman)4
 Wakeman Townsend-Wakeman Rough Riders (Wakeman before 1952, pre-1925-53, to Huron-Erie League)4

 Concurrent with Twin Valley League pre-1936-41.
 Concurrent with Firelands League 1934-53.
 Concurrent with Northern Ohio Athletic League 1927-47, then Firelands League 1947-53.
 Concurrent with Good Neighbors League pre-1936-41).

Huron-Erie League
This conference, the direct precursor to the  Firelands Conference, was formed in 1953, as the Huron County League merged with two Erie County members of the old Firelands League, causing the remaining members to form the Lakeland Conference. With four members (and one new consolidation) remaining, the league dissolved and found new members to form the FC.

see Huron-Erie League Standings

Berlin Heights Tigers (1953-1960) (to Firelands Conference)
Greenwich Shamrocks (1953-1960) (consolidated into South Central)
Milan Indians (1953-1960) (to Firelands Conference)
Monroeville Eagles (1953-1960) (to Firelands Conference)
New Haven Yellow Jackets (1953-1957) (consolidated into Huron Valley)
North Fairfield Indians (1953-1960) (consolidated into South Central)
Plymouth Huron Valley Pilgrims (1957–58) (State voided consolidation in Feb. 1958. Plymouth retained school, New Haven consolidated with Willard)
Collins Western Reserve Rough Riders(1953-1960) (Wakeman Townsend-Wakeman before 1959, to Firelands Conference)

Johnny Appleseed Conference
The all-time members of the Johnny Appleseed Conference.

 Bellville Blue Jays (1962–1963)
 Butler Bulldogs (1962–1963)
 North Robinson Colonel Crawford Eagles (1962–1963)
 Crestline Bulldogs (1962–1977)
 Fredericktown Freddies (1962–1977)
 Lexington Minutemen (1962–1980, football 1965-1980)
 Loudonville Redbirds (1962–1980)
 Ontario Warriors (1962–1980)
 Plymouth Big Red (1962–1979)
 Bellville Clear Fork Colts (Consolidation of Bellville and Butler, 1963–1980)
 Galion Northmor Golden Knights (1964–1967)
 Ashland Crestview Cougars (1965–1979)
 Lucas Cubs (1965–1967)

Lakeshore Conference
(1963–1972; 1979–1985)
The Lakeshore Conference were two separate leagues made-up of schools that were in both loops.  The original conference was formed in 1963 and folded in 1972 when four of its six members left.  The second Lakeshore Conference came into existence around 1979 and folded after the 1985 football season.

First Version
Danbury Lakers (1963–72)
 Green Springs Bobcats (1963–69, consolidated into Clyde)
Elmore Bulldogs (1963–68, consolidated into Woodmore)
Northwood Rangers (1963–72, to Michigan-Ohio Border Conference)
 Rudolph Westwood Warriors (1963–66, consolidated into Bowling Green)
Woodville Warriors (1963–68, consolidated Woodmore in 1968)
Grand Rapids Pirates (1967–68, consolidated into Otsego)
 North Baltimore Tigers (1969–72)
Tontogany Otsego Knights (1967–72, to Suburban Lakes League)
Ottawa Hills Green Bears (1967–72, to Michigan-Ohio Border Conference)
 Norwalk St. Paul Flyers (1967–68)
Woodmore Wildcats (1968–72, to SLL)

Second Version:
Danbury Lakers (1979-fall 85)
Hopewell-Loudon Chieftains (1979-fall 85)
North Baltimore Tigers (1979-fall 85)
Northwood Rangers (1979-fall 85)
Ottawa Hills Green Bears (1979-fall 85)
St. Wendelin Mohawks (1982-fall 85)
Seneca East Tigers (1979-fall 1985)

The league folded after the 1985 football season when Hopewell-Loudon, North Baltimore, St. Wendelin and Seneca East left for the Midland Athletic League.  This left Danbury, Northwood, and Ottawa Hills as independents until Northwood joined the Suburban Lakes League in 1986 and the other two joined the Toledo Area Athletic Conference in 1988.

Six Schools Set For New League

Lake Plains Conference
A short-lived triangular league started by independent schools, the conference lasted five years before two of the three schools joined more established leagues.

 Bowling Green Bobcats (1964–69, to Great Lakes League)
 Lima Central Catholic Thunderbirds (1964–69, to Miami Valley League)
 Defiance Bulldogs (1964–69, to Western Buckeye League 1973)

Little Big League
Formed as Northern Ohio League in 1911 and then renamed Little Big 6 after Bellevue and Fremont Ross join in 1912.  Renamed Little Big 7 after Oberlin joins in 1921.  Elyria and Lorain replaced by Tiffin Columbian and Willard in 1927.  Renamed Little Big 5 after Fremont Ross, Sandusky and Tiffin Columbian leave to form Buckeye Conference and are replaced by Port Clinton.  Became Little Big 4 once Oberlin moved to the Southwestern League in 1937, most of the league grouped with other schools under the NOL banner in 1944.

 Elyria Pioneers1 (1911–26, to Lake Erie)
 Lorain Steelmen1 (1911–26, to Lake Erie)
 Norwalk Truckers (1911–44, to Northern Ohio League)
 Sandusky Blue Streaks (1911–34, to Buckeye League)
 Bellevue Redmen (1912–44, to Northern Ohio League)
 Fremont Ross Little Giants (1912–34, to Buckeye League)
 Oberlin Indians (1921–37, to Southwestern League)
 Tiffin Columbian Tornados (1927–34, to Buckeye League)
 Willard Crimson Flashes (1927–44, to Northern Ohio League)
 Port Clinton Redskins (1934–44, to Sandusky Bay 1948)

 Concurrent with Lake Erie League 1923-26.

Maumee Valley League
The MVL began in 1931, as four of the larger schools of the Lucas County League joined with Perrysburg and Rossford, two of their larger neighbors nearby in Wood County. In 1945, all of the schools except for Holland (who jumped from the LCL when Point Place closed) left to join the Great Northern Conference, along with LCL team Oregon Clay. The remaining Lucas County teams merged into the MVL. Three of these schools merged to form Anthony Wayne in 1951. After some changes, the league entered its last leg in 1957, when Delta and Swanton left, leaving four members. Within the next three years, three of the four found other conference homes.

 Sylvania Burnham Wildcats (1931–45, left to form Great Northern Conference)
 Maumee Panthers (1931–45, left to form Great Northern Conference)
 Perrysburg Yellow Jackets (1931–45, left to form Great Northern Conference)
 Point Place Pirates (1931–37, school consolidated into Toledo City Schools)
 Rossford Bulldogs (1931–45, left to form Great Northern Conference)
 Toledo Whitmer Panthers (1931–45, left to form Great Northern Conference)
 Holland Blue Zippers (1937–60, became Springfield 1960, joined Northern Lakes League 1962)
 Delta Panthers (1945–57, to Northwest Ohio Athletic League)
 Monclova Cardinals (1945–51, consolidated into Anthony Wayne)
 Ottawa Hills Green Bears (1945–59, to Seaway Conference)
 Swanton Bulldogs (1945–57, to Northwest Ohio Athletic League)
 Waterville Wildcats (1945–51, consolidated into Anthony Wayne)
 Whitehouse Tigers (1945–51, consolidated into Anthony Wayne)
 Whitehouse Anthony Wayne Generals (1951–53, left for Great Northern Conference)
 Temperance (MI) Bedford Kicking Mules (1952–60, to Great Lakes League)
 Archbold Blue Streaks (1953–60, to Northwest Ohio Athletic League)

Michigan-Ohio Border Conference
 Blissfield (MI) Royals (1973–77, to Lenawee County Conference (MI))
 Dundee (MI) Vikings (1973–1981, to Lenawee County Conference (MI))
 Erie (MI) Mason Eagles (1973–1981, to Lenawee County Conference (MI) 1988)
 Ida (MI) Bluestreaks (1973–1981, to Lenawee County Conference (MI) 1988)
 Northwood Rangers1 (1973-1981, to Lakeshore)
 Ottawa Hills Green Bears1 (1973-1981, to Lakeshore)
 Ottawa Lake (MI) Whiteford Bobcats (1973–75, to Tri-County (Southeast MI)

 Concurrent with Lakeshore 1979-81.

Six Schools Set For New League

Mid-Western League
(1929-1936)

 Ada Bulldogs
 Celina Bulldogs
 Kenton Wildcats
 St. Marys Memorial Roughriders 
 Van Wert Cougars 
 Wapakoneta Redskins

Midland Athletic League
(1985-2014)

Conference Website: http://www.tiffinohiosports.com/midland_athletic_league.html

Bettsville Bobcats  (no football, 1985-2014)
Bascom Hopewell-Loudon Chieftains (1985-2014)
New Riegel Blue Jackets  (no football, 1985-2014)
North Baltimore Tigers (1985-2014)
Old Fort Stockaders (no football, 1985-2014)
Fostoria St. Wendelin Mohawks (1985-2014, football 1985-2009)
Attica Seneca East Tigers (1985-2014)
Tiffin Calvert Senecas (1986-2014)
Fremont St. Joseph Crimson Streaks (1986-2014)
Carey Blue Devils (1990-2014)
Sycamore Mohawk Warriors (1990-2014)
Kansas Lakota Raiders (2009-2014)

North Central Conference (Crawford County area)

 New Washington Buckeye Central Bucks (1962-2014)
 North Robinson Colonel Crawford Eagles (1962-2014)
 Marion Elgin Comets (1962–90, Left for the Mid-Ohio Athletic Conference)
 Sycamore Mohawk Warriors (1962–90, Left for the Midland Athletic League)
 Marion Pleasant Spartans (1962–90, Left for the Mid-Ohio Athletic Conference)
 Morral Ridgedale Rockets (1962–90, Left for the Mid-Ohio Athletic Conference)
 Mt. Blanchard Riverdale Falcons (1962-2014)
 Caledonia River Valley Vikings (1962–90, Left for the Mid-Ohio Athletic Conference)
 Carey Blue Devils (1963–90, Left for the Midland Athletic League)
 Bucyrus Wynford Royals (1963-2014)
 Crestline Bulldogs (1990-2014)
 Fredericktown Freddies (1990–99, Left for the Mid-Buckeye Conference)
 Ontario Warriors (1990-2013, Left for the Northern Ohio League)
 Lucas Cubs (1998-2013, Left for the Mid-Buckeye Conference)
 Bucyrus Redmen (2002–14)
 Galion Tigers (2011–14)
 Upper Sandusky Rams (2011–14)

Northern Border League
see NBL History
 Archbold Blue Streaks (1969–1978)
 Delta Panthers (1969–1978)
 Evergreen Vikings (1969–1978)
 Liberty Center Tigers (1969–1978)
 Montpelier Locomotives (1969–1978)
 Hamler Patrick Henry Patriots (1969–1978)
 Swanton Bulldogs (1969–1978)
 Wauseon Indians (1969–1978)

Archbold, Liberty Center, Montpelier, and Wauseon were dual members of the NBL and the NWOAL during the league's entire existence.  Evergreen was for the first two years of the league's existence until fully staying in the NBL.  See NWOAL for the league history.

Northern Ohio League

Note: Six of the remaining NOL members were absorbed by the Sandusky Bay Conference for the 2017-18 school year.

 Bellevue Redmen (1944-2017)
 Bucyrus Redmen (1944-2002)
 Tiffin Columbian Tornadoes (1954-2017)
 Crestline Bulldogs (1944–54)
 Fostoria Redmen (2002–11)
 Galion Tigers (1944-2011)
 Norwalk Truckers (1944-2017)
 Ontario Warriors (2013-2017)
 Sandusky Blue Streaks (2011-2017)
 Shelby Whippets (1944-2017)
 Upper Sandusky Rams (1944-2011)
 Willard Crimson Flashes (1944-2017)

Northwest Buckeye League
(football only)
Antwerp Archers (1971- )
Convoy Crestview Knights (1969–70)
Edon Bombers
Sherwood Fairview Apaches (1969-??)
Hicksville Aces
West Unity Hilltop Cadets (1971- )
Payne Panthers

Ohio Heartland Conference
Ashland Arrows (1987–2003)
Lexington Minutemen (1987–2003)
Mansfield Madison Comprehensive Rams (1987–2003)
Mansfield Malabar Falcons (1987–1989, merged with Mansfield Senior)
Mansfield Senior Tygers (1987–2003)
Marion Harding Presidents (1987–2003)
Orrville Red Riders (1989–2003)
Vermilion Sailors (1999–2003)

Ashland, Lexington, Madison, Mansfield Senior, and Orrville helped to form the Ohio Cardinal Conference in 2003.  Vermilion joined the West Shore Conference while Marion Harding left for the Greater Buckeye Conference.

Ohio Scholastic League
(1948-1951)

 Alliance Aviators (1948–51
 Mansfield Tygers (1948-1951)
 Massillon Washington Tigers (1948-1951)
 Canton McKinley Bulldogs (1949-1951)
 Toledo Waite Indians (1948-1951)
 Warren Warren G. Harding Panthers (1948-1951)

The football-only league dissolved in May 1952, prior to the 1952 football season.  Distance and low gate receipts were cited as reasons for folding the league.  Toledo Waite representatives also mentioned that having to play conference newcomer Toledo Macomber in the Toledo City League would have made it impossible for them to continue playing in both leagues.

An interest in joining the league was expressed by Hamilton, Middletown, Springfield, and Toledo Libbey in 1949, but those schools ultimately decided the travel was too much for them to consider as well.

Ohio Wrestling League (wrestling only)
Disbanded after 2013-2014 season when the Blanchard Valley Conference expanded.
 Arcadia Redskins (Blanchard Valley Conference)
 Oregon Cardinal Stritch Cardinals (Toledo Area Athletic Conference)
 Mount Cory/Rawson Cory-Rawson Hornets (Blanchard Valley Conference)
 Gibsonburg Golden Bears (Toledo Area Athletic Conference)
 McComb Panthers (Blanchard Valley Conference)
 Northwood Rangers (Toledo Area Athletic Conference)
 Toledo Christian Eagles (Toledo Area Athletic Conference)
 Van Buren Black Knights (Blanchard Valley Conference)

Richland County League
see the Richland County Standings
 Bellville Blue Jays (1948-1963)
 Butler Bulldogs (1948-1963)
 Lexington Minutemen (1948-1963)
 Lucas Cubs (1946-1963)
 Ontario Warriors (1948-1963)
 Plymouth Big Red (1948-1963)
 Shiloh Lions (1948-1958, Merged with Plymouth to create Plymouth-Shiloh School District)
 Union (1947-1963, Merged with Savannah in 1963 and consolidated in Ashland Crestview in 1964)

San-Wood League
Grand Rapids Pirates (1961/62-1962/63)
 Green Springs Bobcats (1961/62-1962/63)
 Maumee Valley Country Day (1961/62-1962/63)
 Olney/Northwood (1962/63) (last year of Olney HS, referred to as both names in various media during school year)
Tontogany Otsego Knights (1961/62-1962/63)
Woodville Warriors (1961/62-1962/63)

Sandusky County League
While containing only Sandusky County teams for most of its existence, at one point the conference had members from four different counties. The league disbanded in 1967, as three of its four remaining schools already had ties with the Lakeshore League, starting in 1963.

 Clyde Fliers (192?-34, to Firelands League, 1939–49, to Sandusky Bay Conference)
 Gibsonburg Golden Bears (192?-48, to Sandusky Bay Conference)
 Green Springs  Bobcats (192?-67, to Lakeshore League)
 Burgoon Jackson Bruins (192?-60, consolidated into Lakota)
 Vickery Townsend Trojans (192?-52, consolidated into Margaretta)
 Woodville Panthers (192?-67, to Lakeshore League)
 York Panthers (192?-67, consolidated into Bellevue)
 Elmore Bulldogs (1948–67, to Lakeshore League)
 Jackson-Liberty Bullpups (1959–60, consolidated into Lakota)
 Risingsun Tigers (1959–60, consolidated into Lakota)

Sandusky River League

All schools in the SRL headed to the Sandusky Bay Conference in 2016.

 Kansas Lakota Raiders (2014-2016)
 New Riegel Blue Jackets (2014-2016)
 Old Fort Stockaders (2014-2016)
 Fremont St. Joseph (SJCC) Crimson Streaks (2014-2016)
 Sandusky St. Mary (SMCC) Panthers (2014-2016)
 Fostoria St. Wendelin Mohawks (2014-2016)

Seaway Conference
 Elmore Bulldogs (1959–1963)
 Gibsonburg Golden Bears (1959–1963)
 Danbury Lakeside Lakers (1959–1963)
 North Baltimore Tigers (1959–1967)
 Ottawa Hills Green Bears (1959–1967)
 Fostoria St. Wendelin Mohawks (1959–1967)
 Grand Rapids Pirates (1963-1967)
 Tontogany Otsego Knights (1963-1967)

Seneca-Sandusky League
(1933-???)
Amsden
Bettsville
Burgoon
Green Springs
Old Fort

Suburban Lakes League

(1972–2011)
 Pemberville Eastwood Eagles (1972-2011, left for Northern Buckeye Conference)
 Bloomdale Elmwood Royals (1972-2011, left for Northern Buckeye Conference)
 Genoa Area Comets (1972-2011, left for Northern Buckeye Conference)
 Gibsonburg Golden Bears (1972-2011, left for the Toledo Area Athletic Conference)
 Kansas Lakota Raiders (1972-2009, left for Midland Athletic League)
 Oak Harbor Rockets (1972–86, left for Sandusky Bay Conference)
 Tontogany Otsego Knights (1972-2011, left for Northern Buckeye Conference)
 Elmore Woodmore Wildcats (1972-2011, left for Northern Buckeye Conference)
 Northwood Rangers (1986-2000, left for the Toledo Area Athletic Conference)
 Millbury Lake Flyers (1996-2011, left for Northern Buckeye Conference)

Trolley League
(1919-1921/22?)
Bowling Green
Findlay
Fostoria
Lima (Central and/or South?)
Tiffin

Twin Valley League
(1936/37-???)
Adario
Greenwich
New Haven
North Fairfield
Plymouth
Shiloh

Wood County "B" League
The smaller schools in Wood County started to organize into leagues in the early 1930s, originally competing in three separate leagues: the Northern Wood County League, Southeast Wood County League, and Western Wood County League. By 1959, consolidation and schools leaving for other leagues had whittled the three leagues down to two, with the Northern and Southeast leagues combining into the Eastern Wood County League. This would only last for one year, as further consolidation caused a merger into a single league. The league ended in 1963, as the number of schools was whittled to three.

Full Membership List
 Bloomdale Bulldogs (193?-60, Consolidated into Elmwood)
 Cygnet Zippers (193?-60, consolidated into Elmwood)
 Grand Rapids Pirates (193?-63, to Seaway Conference)
 Haskins Hawks (193?-1957/58, consolidated into Otsego)
 Hoytville Jackson Knights (193?-60, consolidated into McComb)
 Milbury Lake Flyers (193?-60, to Northern Lakes League)
 Milton Center Mustangs (193?-56, consolidated into Westwood)
 Wayne Montgomery Eagles (193?-1957/58, consolidated into Otsego)
 North Baltimore Tigers (193?-63, to Seaway Conference)
 Olney Eagles (193?-60, consolidated into Lake. Northwood opens in 1963)
Tontogany Otsego Knights (1958/59-???, to Lakeshore Conference)
 Pemberville Redmen (193?-59, consolidated into Eastwood)
 Portage Panthers (193?-60, consolidated into Elmwood)
 Risingsun Tigers (193?-59, to Sandusky County League)
 Rudolph Liberty Township Lions (193?-56, consolidated into Westwood)
 Luckey Troy-Luckey Trojans (193?-59, consolidated into Eastwood)
 Tontogany Washington Township Indians (193?-1957/58, consolidated into Otsego)
 Scotch Ridge Webster Township Scots (193?-59, consolidated into Eastwood)
 Weston Warriors (193?-57/58, consolidated into Otsego)
 Waterville Beavers (1945–51, from Maumee Valley, consolidated into Anthony Wayne)
 Rudolph Westwood Warriors (1956–63, to Lakeshore Conference)

League Alignments

1960-63

1959-60

Pre-1959

Wyandot County League
A county league for smaller schools that existed before 1939, and folded in 1961.

 Edenville Eden Golden Flashes (pre-1939-50, consolidated into Nevada, in 1961, split from Nevada, consolidated into Upper Sandusky)
 Harpster Crusaders (pre-1939-61, consolidated into Upper Sandusky)
 Marseilles Bulldogs (pre-1939-61, consolidated into Upper Sandusky)
 McCutchenville Big Red (pre-1939-58, consolidated into Mohawk)
 Nevada Bobcats (pre-1939-61, left for Crawford County League)
 Lovell Salem Cornhuskers (pre-1939-61, consolidated into Upper Sandusky)
 Sycamore Wildcats (pre-1939-58, consolidated into Mohawk)
 Wharton Dragons (pre-1939-60, left for Hardin County League)
 Sycamore Mohawk Warriors (1958–60, left for Sandusky Bay Conference)

See also
Ohio High School Athletic Association
Ohio High School Athletic Conferences
OHSAA Northwest Region athletic conferences

Notes and references